Taylor Fresh Foods (known colloquially as Taylor Farms) is an American-based producer of fresh-cut fruits and vegetables. It is based in Salinas, California. Taylor Farms was founded by former Fresh Express (now Chiquita) founder and CEO, Bruce Taylor, in 1995. As of 2009, Taylor Farms is  ranked as the world's largest salad and fresh-cut vegetable processor. The company distributes their produce through third-parties like Golden State Foods to several California school districts and chain restaurants, such as McDonald's and Chipotle Mexican Grill.

History
Taylor Farms was founded by Bruce Taylor, who is the third generation of his family to work in the fresh produce business. He first founded Fresh Express, which later was acquired by Wahquita Brands. In 1995, he and several partners then formed Taylor Farms, which partners with 100+ Salinas Valley farm operations.

In May 2011, Taylor Farms acquired River Ranch Fresh Foods, LLC as a wholly owned subsidiary. River Ranch then closed in 2013.

In August 2015, Taylor Farms inaugurated its downtown Salinas headquarters, a 100,000 square feet, $38 million facility, home to approximately 150 employees working in all three Taylor Farms segments; Foodservice, Retail, and Deli.

Operations
Taylor Farms supplies many of the largest supermarket chains and foodservice restaurants in the United States. Taylor Farms headquarters are located in Salinas, California with 2,000 employees; and with regional processing plants with another 8,000 employees in the following locations: Salinas, California; Tracy, California; Gonzales, California; Yuma, Arizona; Dallas, Texas; Colorado Springs, Colorado; Smyrna, Tennessee; Orlando, Florida; Annapolis Junction, Maryland; Swedesboro, New Jersey; Quonset, Rhode Island; Chicago, Illinois; Kent, Washington and San Miguel de Allende, Mexico.

Taylor Farms has faced difficulties with labor shortages, labor contractors, and salaries. In addition, the company has been subject to claims that they abused the 'temporary worker' contractors by keeping the 'temporary' employees as low-salaried long-term employees.

In 2012, Taylor Farms introduced fuel cell technology as an energy efficiency development, cutting energy costs at one facility by 30%. The company has also developed a facility utilizing co-generation, wind, and solar energy.

Food safety recalls
Taylor was one of the companies whose products were recalled due to food safety concerns in 2011, including a May recall of salads mixed with grape tomatoes supplied by Florida growers and an October recall of salad blends produced by Taylor. No illnesses related to consumption of the recalled products were reported. Additional product recalls in 2012 included mangoes voluntarily removed August 30 by Taylor Farms New Jersey and retailers from East Coast food stores in four states. Drew McDonald, vice president of national quality systems for Taylor, had testified at a 2009 house panel convened to consider the Food Safety Enhancement Act of 2009. In this testimony, McDonald expressed the opinion that final-product testing doesn’t improve food safety and, in some cases, punishes good facilities for their surveillance when a problem is found.

Teamsters Union protest 
In 2016, members of the International Brotherhood of Teamsters, a labor union, protested in front of Chipotle restaurants, aiming to pressure the chain to recognize their supplier, Taylor Farm, to the union.

References

External links

Companies based in Monterey County, California
Companies established in 1995
Economy of Salinas, California
Food and drink companies of the United States